Pablo Alfonso Espinosa de los Monteros Rueda is an Ecuadorian news anchor and vice-president of news of Ecuavisa in Quito. He holds the Guinness World Record for "Longest career as Television News broadcaster".

Early life
Espinosa de los Monteros was born on 25 December 1941, in Quito, Ecuador.

Career
He worked for different radio stations in the cities of Ibarra and Guayaquil until 1962. In 1963 he was news director for "Radio La Prensa".  He began in Ecuavisa in 1967, the year of its foundation, as the first news anchor of the station.  He was News Director for almost three decades. 

He has been the master of ceremonies in television shows carried out by several editions of the election of Miss Ecuador, Queen of Quito, and the International Song Festival OTI Ecuador Chapter, which gave birth to the OTI Festival. As an interviewer, he has conducted opinion programs such as "Ante la Prensa," "Encuentro," "Punto de vista," and "Presidential Decisions." He hosted the Ecuadorian version of "Who wants to be millionaire" (2001 - 2004 and 2009 - 2011).

On October 13, 2016, he presented the first volume of his book entitled "Memories," a work in which he recounted his experiences as a journalist between 1961 and 2016, a period in which Ecuador lived through populist regimes, dictatorship, and other governments.

He received the “Honorato Vázquez” medal from the Ecuadorian government in 1992. 

In 2013, after a survey carried out in Ecuador, he emerged as the news anchor with the highest credibility index, with 21.4%.

In 2015, in the solemn session for the founding process of Guayaquil, Mayor Jaime Nebot awarded him a Prize for Cultural Merit for his trajectory.

References 

1941 births
Ecuadorian television presenters
People from Quito
Living people
Ecuadorian journalists
Male journalists